Carlos Edmundo Sevilla Dalgo (born 26 August 1950) in an Ecuadorian former football player and manager of El Nacional.

Playing career

Club
Sevilla had a brief playing career as a defender mainly playing for Deportivo Quito.

Managerial career
In 1984, he debuted as a manager for his former club. He has since managed sixteen other clubs in Ecuador and Peru. In 1999, he briefly managed the Ecuador national team. He led Ecuador to their first international title: the 1999 Canada Cup. At the club level, he has led Emelec and Deportivo Quito to national titles in 2001 and 2008, respectively.

Honors
Ecuador
Canada Cup: 1999

Emelec
Serie A: 2001

Deportivo Quito
Serie A: 2008

References

External links

1950 births
Living people
People from Atuntaqui
Association football defenders
Ecuadorian footballers
S.D. Quito footballers
C.D. Técnico Universitario footballers
Ecuadorian football managers
S.D. Quito managers
C.D. El Nacional managers
L.D.U. Quito managers
C.S. Emelec managers
1999 Copa América managers
Ecuador national football team managers
Cienciano managers
Barcelona S.C. managers
C.S.D. Independiente del Valle managers
Expatriate football managers in Peru
C.S.D. Macará managers
Fuerza Amarilla S.C. managers